Chondrina is a genus of small air-breathing land snails, terrestrial pulmonate gastropod mollusks in the family Chondrinidae.

All species of Chondrina are restricted to the West Palaearctic. Centers of species diversity are found on the Iberian peninsula, in northern Italy and in the Balkans. The species are restricted to calcareous rocks, and occur only on vertical, exposed rock faces.

Species
There are more than 40 extant species in the genus Chondrina, with four new species described in 2010.
 Chondrina aguilari Altimira, 1967
 Chondrina altimirai Gittenberger, 1973
 Chondrina amphorula Schileyko, 1984	  
 Chondrina arcadica (Reinhardt, 1881) - per AnimalBase is its synonym Chondrina clienta (Westerlund, 1883) but it is considered valid by other authors
 Chondrina arigonis (Rossmässler, 1859)
 Chondrina arigonoides Kokshoorn & Gittenberger, 2010
 Chondrina ascendens (Westerlund, 1878)
 Chondrina avenacea (Bruguière, 1792) - type species
 Chondrina bergomensis (Küster, 1850)
 Chondrina bigorriensis (Des Moulins, 1835)
 Chondrina calpica (Westerlund, 1872)
 Chondrina centralis (Fagot, 1891)
 Chondrina cliendentata E. Gittenberger, 1973
 Chondrina dertosensis (Bofill, 1886)
 Chondrina falkneri Gittenberger, 2002
 Chondrina farinesii (Des Moulins, 1835)
 Chondrina feneriensis Bodon, Nardi, Cianfanelli & Kokshoorn, 2015
 Chondrina gasulli Gittenberger, 1973
 Chondrina gavirai Ahuir & Torres, 2017
 Chondrina generosensis Nordsieck, 1962
 Chondrina gerhardi Gittenberger, 2002
 Chondrina gomezi Ahuir & Torres, 2017
 Chondrina granatensis Alonso, 1974
 Chondrina guiraonis Pilsbry, 1918
 Chondrina ingae Kokshoorn & Gittenberger, 2010
 Chondrina jumillensis (L. Pfeiffer, 1853)
 Chondrina keltiensis Ahuir & Torres, 2017
 Chondrina klemmi Gittenberger, 1973
 Chondrina kobelti (Westerlund, 1887)
 Chondrina kobeltoides Gittenberger, 1973
 Chondrina lusitanica (Pfeiffer, 1848)
 Chondrina maginensis Arrébola & Gómez, 1998
 Chondrina marjae Kokshoorn & Gittenberger, 2010
 Chondrina marmouchana (Pallary, 1928)
 Chondrina massotiana (Bourguignat, 1863)
 Chondrina megacheilos (De Cristofori & Jan, 1832)
 Chondrina multidentata (Strobel, 1851)
 Chondrina oligodonta (Del Prete, 1879)
 Chondrina pseudavenacea Kokshoorn & Gittenberger, 2010
 Chondrina pseudoteresae Ahuir & Torres, 2017
 Chondrina ripkeni Gittenberger, 1973
 Chondrina soleri Altimira, 1960
 Chondrina spelta (Beck, 1837)
 Chondrina tatrica Ložek, 1948
 Chondrina tenuimarginata (Des Moulins, 1835)

References

External links 

Chondrinidae
Gastropod genera
Taxonomy articles created by Polbot
Taxa named by Ludwig Reichenbach